Alfred Thomas Grove (born 8 April 1924) is a British geographer and climatologist. He is Emeritus Fellow of Downing College, Cambridge and was former Director of the Centre of African Studies at the University of Cambridge. Grove researched  Environmental Issues and Policy and the landscape change in southern Europe and Climate change and desertification with a focus on Africa and southern Europe.

Career and work  
1949-1982 he was Lecturer at the Department of Geography, University of Cambridge and from 1980-1986 Director of the Centre for African Studies. 1963-1991 he was appointed fellow of the Downing College. He has written a number of books, including "Africa South of the Sahara", and various books about the Little Ice Age in Europe. So together (with Jean Grove) 'Little Ice Ages Ancient and Modern', 2004 and The "Little Ice Age" and its geomorphological consequences in Mediterranean Europe' and together with Oliver Rackham', The Nature of Mediterranean Europe', an important contribution to environmental history. With regard to the alleged tragedy of the commons and neomalthusian approaches e.g. of Garrett Hardin he denounced Hardins interpretation of the failure of commons  as the one of "an American with no notion at all how Commons actually work".

While Grove does support increasing evidence of human activity is causing global warming, he sees definite and conclusive evidence in the field of climate change as almost an impossibility. Nevertheless, his consideration of the problem in his 2010 paper leads him to the conclusion that despite this inherent uncertainty, the evidence that human activity is causing global warming is substantial, and that it is therefore 'safer to act, to mitigate and adapt with the aim of slowing down change'. In his work about Mediterranean Europe he doubts the common wisdom of a 'Lost Eden,' a formerly fertile region, that had been progressively degraded and desertified by human mismanagement.  The simplistic, environmental determinist notion of a Mediterranean Paradise on Earth in antiquity, which was destroyed by destructive later civilizations dates however back to at least the eighteenth century and was fashionable in archaeological and historical circles for centuries. However the authors argue that this believe stems from the failure of the recent landscape to measure up to the imaginary past as idealized by artists, poets and scientists of the early modern Enlightenment. Grove and Rackham tried to track the evolution of climate, vegetation and landscape in southern Europe from prehistoric times till present and point out that climate has usually been unstable and plant cover accommodated to various extremes and became resilient with regard to various patterns of human activity. The authors assume that people had already transformed most parts of Mediterranean Europe 4,000 years ago and the “humanization of the landscape” overlapped with the appearance of the present Mediterranean climate. In so far humanization was not the cause of climate change. To the contrary, the wide ecological diversity typical of Mediterranean Europe was man made. The greatest human induced changes came since World War II as rural populations throughout the region abandoned traditional subsistence economies and left the traditional agricultural patterns towards setting sceneries for travelers, which resulted in more monotonous, large-scale formations. As real threats to Mediterranean landscapes they see the overdevelopment of coastal areas, abandonment of mountains and the already mentioned loss of traditional agricultural occupations.

Family and heritage 
Grove married Jean Mary Clark (1927–2001), herself a renowned glaciologist and climate historian and sister of Margaret Spufford. They had six children, among them Richard Grove. Grove is among the trustees of the Jean Grove Trust in Cambridge, a small Roman Catholic charity which funds the education of children in Ethiopia through direct links with four schools in different parts of the country.

Selected publications 
 Andrew S. Cohen, Bert Van Bocxlaer, Jonathan A. Todd, Michael McGlue, Ellinor Michel, Hudson H. Nkotagu, A.T. Grove, Damien Delvaux, "Quaternary ostracodes and molluscs from the Rukwa Basin (Tanzania) and their evolutionary and paleobiogeographic implications", Palaeogeography, Palaeoclimatology, Palaeoecology 392 (2013) 79–97.
 A.T. Grove and E. Lopez-Gunn (2010) Uncertainty in Climate Change, Real Instituto Elcano working paper, Madrid, Spain.

References

External links 
 britannica entry
 University website

1924 births
Living people
British climatologists
British geographers
British Roman Catholics
Fellows of Downing College, Cambridge